Macrosemiiformes is an extinct order of ray-finned fish with one family, Macrosemiidae. The group evolved during the Late Triassic and disappeared during the Late Cretaceous. The group has been found in rock formations in Africa, Australia, Eurasia and North America.

Taxonomy

†Order Macrosemiiformes
†Family Macrosemiidae, Thiollière, 1858
 Genus †Aphanepygus 
 Genus †Disticholepis
 Genus †Enchelyolepis
 Genus †Orthurus
 Genus †Petalopteryx
 Genus †Neonotagogus
 Genus †Histionotus
 Genus †Legnonotus
 Genus †Macrosemius
 Genus †Propterus
 Genus †Ophiopsis
†'Family Uarbryichthyidae
 Genus †Uarbryichthys''

Timeline of genera

References

 

 
Prehistoric ray-finned fish orders